Abenia is a surname. Notable people with the surname include:

Adriana Abenia (born 1984), Spanish television presenter, model, and actress
Roberto Abenia (born 1972), Spanish goalball player